The men's sanda (as Sanshou) 70 kg competition at the 2010 Asian Games in Guangzhou, China was held from 14 November to 17 November at the Nansha Gymnasium.

A total of sixteen competitors from sixteen countries competed in this event, limited to fighters whose body weight was less than 70 kilograms.

Zhang Yong from China won the gold medal after beating Cai Liang Chan of Macau in gold medal bout in two straight rounds 2–0, Zhang won both periods in the final. The bronze medal was shared by Sajjad Abbasi from Iran and Vương Đình Khanh of Vietnam after they lost in their semifinal matches.

Athletes from South Korea (Yoo Sang-hoon), Kazakhstan (Birzhan Abdolla), Chinese Taipei (Chou Ting-yuan) and Laos (Sommay Xayavong) shared the fifth place.

Athletes from the Philippines (Eduard Folayang), India (Sandeep Yadav), Afghanistan (Mohammad Salim Zarifi), Lebanon (Elias El-Rayess), Thailand (Artit Srisomboon), Kyrgyzstan (Stalbek Darkanbaev), Pakistan (Kamran Khalid) and Turkmenistan (Nurmyrat Babayev) lost in the first round and did not advance further.

Schedule
All times are China Standard Time (UTC+08:00)

Results

References

External links
Official website

Men's sanda 70 kg